Guntur Bapanaiah (1919 - March 25th 1978) was a freedom fighter, Dalit leader, and an active member of undivided communist party known as Communist Party of India from the 1930s. Bapanaiah was one of founding member of Communist Party of India (Marxist) party after the split in Communist Party of India in 1964. He was the in-charge of agricultural labourers associations for a long period. He was one of the organizers of the peasant struggles in Challapalli Estate during 1938 and 1950. He was elected as M.L.A. to the Madras Legislative Assembly from Divi constituency in 1951. Later he was elected as M.L.A. from Nidumolu assembly constituency for Andhra Pradesh Assembly in 1962 and 1978.

References

External links
http://eci.nic.in/eci_main/StatisticalReports/SE_1951/STATISTICALREPORTS_51_MADRAS.pdf

Communist Party of India (Marxist) politicians from Andhra Pradesh
1919 births
1978 deaths
Members of the Andhra Pradesh Legislative Assembly
Indian independence activists from Andhra Pradesh
Communist Party of India politicians from Andhra Pradesh